Enlil-kudurrī-uṣur, mdEnlil(be)-ku-dúr-uṣur, (Enlil protect the eldest son), was the 81st king of Assyria according to the Assyrian King List.

Biography

Enlil-kudurri-usur was the son of Tukulti-Ninurta I. He succeeded his nephew, Ashur-nirari III’s brief reign and ruled for five years. Apart from king lists and chronicles, there are no other extant inscriptions of this king.

The Synchronistic King List identifies his Babylonian contemporary with Adad-šuma-uṣur, his eventual nemesis. In the Synchronistic History, the battle between him and Adad-šuma-uṣur is given as a pretext for his Assyrian rival, Ninurta-apal-Ekur, a son of Ilī-padâ and descendant of Eriba-Adad I, to “come up from Karduniaš,” i.e. Babylonia, and make a play for the Assyrian throne. Grayson and others have speculated that this was with the tacit assistance of Adad-šuma-uṣur, but there is currently no published evidence to support this theory. Ninurta-apal-Ekur’s purpose for being in Babylonia is also unknown, whether a political refugee or an administrator of the Assyrian held portion. The Walker Chronicle describes how following his abject defeat at Adad-šuma-uṣur’s hands, Enlil-kudurrī-uṣur was seized by his own officers and handed over to his opponent. Only after these events did Adad-šuma-uṣur go on to extend his territory to include the city of Babylon itself.

Meanwhile, the Synchronistic History continues, Ninurta-apal-Ekur had “mustered his numerous troops and marched to conquer Libbi-ali (the city of Aššur). But [...] arrived unexpectedly, so he turned and went home.” As Grayson points out, this passage is open to various interpretations, only one of which is that the missing name could have been that of Enlil-kudurrī-uṣur, released by his captor to sow confusion amongst his northern foes.

Inscriptions

References

12th-century BC Assyrian kings